Sgt. Pepper's Lonely Hearts Club Band is a 1978 American jukebox musical comedy film directed by Michael Schultz, written by Henry Edwards and starring an ensemble cast led by Peter Frampton and The Bee Gees. Depicting the loosely constructed story of a band as they wrangle with the music industry and battle evil forces bent on stealing their instruments and corrupting their hometown of Heartland, the film is presented in a form similar to that of a rock opera, with the songs providing "dialogue" to carry the story. George Burns has most of the spoken lines that act to clarify the plot and provide further narration but there are a few other lines throughout the movie (the robot girls waking Mr. Mustard as Strawberry leaves her house in Heartland).

The film's soundtrack, released as an accompanying double album, features new versions of songs originally written and performed by The Beatles. The film draws primarily from two of the band's albums, 1967's Sgt. Pepper's Lonely Hearts Club Band and 1969's Abbey Road. The film covers all of the songs from the Sgt. Pepper album with the exceptions of "Within You, Without You" and "Lovely Rita", and also includes nearly all of Abbey Road.

The production was loosely adapted from Sgt. Pepper's Lonely Hearts Club Band on the Road, a 1974 off-Broadway production directed by Tom O'Horgan. The film was met with minor box office success but overwhelmingly negative reviews from critics.

Overview
The film was produced by Robert Stigwood, founder of RSO Records, who had earlier produced Saturday Night Fever. RSO Records also released the soundtrack to the film Grease in 1978, which had Barry Gibb producing and Peter Frampton playing lead guitar on the title track. In 1976, the Bee Gees had recorded three Beatles cover songs, "Golden Slumbers / Carry That Weight", "She Came In Through the Bathroom Window" and "Sun King", for the musical documentary All This and World War II.

The Beatles' former producer, George Martin, served as musical director, conductor, arranger and producer of the film's soundtrack album.

Before the film's release, Robin Gibb of the Bee Gees announced: "Kids today don't know the Beatles' Sgt. Pepper. And when those who do see our film and hear us doing it, that will be the version they relate to and remember. Unfortunately, the Beatles will be secondary. You see, there is no such thing as the Beatles. They don't exist as a band and never performed Sgt. Pepper live, in any case. When ours comes out, it will be, in effect, as if theirs never existed. When you heard the Beatles do Long Tall Sally or Roll Over Beethoven, did you care about Little Richard's or Chuck Berry's version?"

Plot
Mr. Kite (George Burns), elderly mayor of the small, wholesome town of Heartland, recounts the history of Heartland's celebrated marching band. Sgt. Pepper and his Lonely Hearts Club Band brought happiness through its music, even causing troops in World Wars I and II to stop fighting. In August 1958, Sgt. Pepper died of a heart attack in the middle of a performance, at the unveiling of a new weather vane in his likeness. Sgt. Pepper left the band's magical musical instruments to the town; so long as they remain in Heartland, its people will live happily ever after. Heartland City Hall, which doubles as a Sgt. Pepper museum, contains the instruments. Sgt. Pepper left his musical legacy to his handsome and good-hearted grandson, Billy Shears (Peter Frampton). Billy forms a new Lonely Hearts Club Band with his three best friends: brothers Mark, Dave, and Bob Henderson (The Bee Gees). Billy's charming but avaricious half-brother, Dougie (Paul Nicholas), serves as the band's manager ("The Sgt. Pepper's Lonely Hearts Club Band Welcome").

Heartland loves the new band ("With a Little Help from My Friends"), and soon Big Deal Records president B.D. Hoffler (Donald Pleasence) invites them to Hollywood with the promise of a record deal ("Fixing a Hole"), to which the band accepts ("Getting Better"). Billy bids farewell to his sweet hometown girlfriend, Strawberry Fields (Sandy Farina) ("Here Comes the Sun"). Once in Hollywood, B.D. introduces the band to their new labelmates, sexy singers Lucy (Dianne Steinberg) and the Diamonds (Stargard), and they negotiate the contract over a sex-and-drug-induced dinner ("I Want You (She's So Heavy)"). Hitting it off with Lucy, Billy all but forgets about Strawberry. The band quickly succeeds ("Good Morning, Good Morning"), with hit records and sold-out concerts ("Nowhere Man") produced and performed ("Polythene Pam") as quickly ("She Came In Through the Bathroom Window") as they succeeded ("The Sgt. Pepper's Lonely Hearts Club Band Farwell").

Meanwhile, villainous Mr. Mustard (Frankie Howerd) and his henchman the Brute drive to Heartland in their computer- and robot -equipped van. Mustard receives orders from the mysterious FVB to steal the magical instruments from City Hall and distribute them among FVB and its affiliates ("Mean Mr. Mustard"). Without the instruments, Heartland—now under Mustard's control—quickly degenerates into a hotbed of vice and urban decay. Strawberry takes an early morning bus to Hollywood ("She's Leaving Home"), finding them thanks to a billboard promoting them ("Lucy in the Sky With Diamonds"), to tell the band ("Oh! Darling"). Mustard, who has a crush on Strawberry, follows. In Hollywood, the band and Strawberry steal Mustard's van and use its computer to locate the stolen instruments. They recover the cornet from the deranged, money-driven anti-aging specialist Dr. Maxwell Edison (Steve Martin) ("Maxwell's Silver Hammer"), and the tuba from mind-controlling cult leader Father Sun (Alice Cooper) ("Because"). Billy is knocked out twice in each battle, with nothing except Strawberry's love keeping him going ("Strawberry Fields Forever"). The group easily find the bass drum, which Mr. Mustard kept for himself in the van. However, the computer and robots malfunction and self-destruct before they can locate the final missing instrument–the saxophone–which remains in the hands of FVB.

As Heartland continues to deteriorate, Billy and the Hendersons, with a bit of help from Dougie, manage to convince a relieved B.D. to organize a benefit concert to save the town ("Being for the Benefit of Mr. Kite!)". Dougie and Lucy, who have bonded over their shared love of money, plot to run off with the show's proceeds ("You Never Give Me Your Money"). They hide bags of money in Mustard's van while Billy, Strawberry, and the Hendersons are watching Earth, Wind & Fire perform at the benefit ("Got to Get You into My Life"). Mustard and the Brute suddenly arrive and take back the van, which also contains the recovered instruments and the benefit money. They also kidnap Strawberry, with whom Mustard has fallen in love from afar ("When I'm Sixty-Four"). Mustard drives off with Dougie, Lucy, Strawberry, and the money hidden on board. Billy and the Hendersons see the van leave and pursue it in the town's hot air balloon in new uniforms.

Mustard drives to FVB's headquarters, where the Future Villain Band plans to take over the world. This Orwellian hard-rock group (Aerosmith) contrasts the wholesomeness and optimism of Sgt. Pepper's band. FVB is described as "the evil force that would poison young minds, pollute the environment, and subvert the democratic process"; they perform in militaristic uniforms on a high platform stage made to look like stacks of money, accompanied by uniformed youth twirling flags. To turn Strawberry into a "mindless groupie", FVB chains her up onstage while the band plays, ("Come Together") and lead singer (Steven Tyler) fondles her. Dougie and Lucy are also tied up and forced to watch. Billy and the Hendersons arrive and engage FVB in hand-to-hand combat. The singer is thrown off the stage to his death, but unfortunately, so is Strawberry.

The town of Heartland, now cleaned up and the instruments returned, holds an elaborate funeral for Strawberry ("Golden Slumbers"/"Carry That Weight"). The depressed Billy attempts to get Strawberry off his mind ("The Long and Winding Road"); when he cannot, the Hendersons worry for him ("A Day in the Life"). Unable to take it anymore after a couple weeks, Billy attempts suicide by jumping from a rooftop. Before he can hit the ground, in a form of Deus ex machina, the Sgt. Pepper weather vane atop City Hall comes to life (Billy Preston). Wielding magical lightning bolts, the Sgt. Pepper Weather vane catches Billy and reverses his suicide attempt. The Sgt. Pepper weather vane dances through the town square ("Get Back"), transforming Mustard and the Brute into a bishop and a monk. Mustard's van is transformed into a Volkswagen Beetle. Dougie and Lucy are transformed into a priest and a nun. Strawberry is restored to life, and happily embraces Billy. The Sgt. Pepper weather vane also transforms the Hendersons' mourning suits into shiny new uniforms.

In the finale, the cast appear with numerous celebrities in a tribute to the original Beatles album cover (Sgt. Pepper's Lonely Hearts Club Band (Reprise)|The Sgt. Pepper's Lonely Hearts Club Band Farwell (Reprise)]]").

Featured performers
 The Bee Gees (Barry, Robin, and Maurice Gibb) whose music had been integral to Saturday Night Fever (released by this film's international distributor, Paramount Pictures), play Mark, David and Bob Henderson, members of the re-formed Sgt. Pepper's Lonely Hearts Club Band. They also provide the computerized voices for Mean Mr. Mustard's robots.
 Peter Frampton, whose album Frampton Comes Alive! was the biggest-selling live album ever at the time, plays Billy Shears, leader of the re-formed band and grandson of the original Sgt. Pepper character.
 Steve Martin, whose comedy album A Wild and Crazy Guy was released the same year as the film, reaching number two on the music-dominated Billboard 200 album charts, plays Dr. Maxwell Edison.

The cast also features
 Frankie Howerd as Mean Mr. Mustard 
 Paul Nicholas as Dougie Shears
 Donald Pleasence as B.D., referred to as B.D. Hoffler in Burns' narrative voice-over and on a magazine cover in the film, but officially known in the film's credits, publicity materials, and in-film posters as B.D. Brockhurst
 Sandy Farina as Strawberry Fields
 Dianne Steinberg as Lucy
 Aerosmith as Future Villain Band (FVB)
 Alice Cooper as Father Sun
 Earth, Wind & Fire, appearing as Earth, Wind, and Fire, the elements.
 Billy Preston as the magical Sgt. Pepper golden weather vane come to life
 George Burns as Mr. Kite
 Stargard as the Diamonds
 Anna Rodzianko and Rose Aragon as The Computerettes 
 Carel Struycken as The Brute, in his first film appearance
 Patti Jerome as Saralinda Shears 
 Max Showalter as Ernest Shears 
 John Wheeler as Mr. Fields
 Jay W. MacIntosh as Ms. Fields
 Eleanor Zee as Mrs. Henderson 
 Patrick Cranshaw as Western Union Manager
 Teri Lynn Wood as Bonnie 
 Tracy Justrich as Tippy
 The actor playing The Evil Gladiola was neither seen nor credited.

Special guests
Additionally, the film becomes a time capsule of late 1970s pop culture with the last scene in which the cast is joined by "Our Guests at Heartland" to sing the reprise of the title track while standing in a formation imitating the Beatles' Sgt. Pepper album cover. The scene was filmed at MGM Studios on December 16, 1977; indeed, according to co-star Carel Struycken (Mustard's henchman Brute), Sgt. Pepper was the last film to be made at MGM under that studio's then existing management.

The guests were

 Peter Allen
 Keith Allison
 George Benson
 Elvin Bishop
 Stephen Bishop
 Jack Bruce
 Keith Carradine
 Carol Channing
 "Charlotte, Sharon, and Ula" 
 Jim Dandy
 Sarah Dash
 Rick Derringer
 Barbara Dickson
 Donovan
 Dr. John
 Randy Edelman
 Yvonne Elliman
 José Feliciano
 Leif Garrett
 Adrian Gurvitz
 Billy Harper
 Eddie Harris
 Heart
 Nona Hendryx
 Barry Humphries as Dame Edna Everage
 Etta James
 Bruce Johnston
 Joe Lala
 D.C. LaRue
 Jo Leb
 Marcy Levy
 Mark Lindsay
 Nils Lofgren
 John Mayall
 Curtis Mayfield
 Bruce Morrow (Cousin Brucie)
 Peter Noone
 Alan O'Day
 Lee Oskar
 The Paley Brothers
 Robert Palmer
 Wilson Pickett
 Anita Pointer
 Bonnie Raitt
 Helen Reddy
 Minnie Riperton
 Chita Rivera
 Johnny Rivers
 Monte Rock III
 Danielle Rowe
 Seals & Crofts
 Sha-Na-Na
 Del Shannon
 Joe Simon
 Connie Stevens
 Al Stewart
 John Stewart
 Tina Turner
 Frankie Valli
 Gwen Verdon
 Diane Vincent
 Grover Washington, Jr.
 Alan White
 Lenny White
 Jackie Lomax
 Margaret Whiting
 Hank Williams, Jr.
 Johnny Winter
 Wolfman Jack
 Bobby Womack
 Gary Wright

Production
The film began as a 1974 live Broadway show called Sgt. Pepper's Lonely Hearts Club Band on the Road, which was produced by The Robert Stigwood Organization. Stigwood had purchased the rights to use 29 Beatles songs for the play and was determined to do something with them, so he brought the songs to Henry Edwards to write a script. Edwards had never written a script for a film, but had impressed Stigwood with musical analysis he'd written for The New York Times. "I spread the songs out on my apartment floor and went to work", said Edwards. "Mr Stigwood wanted a concept. I told him I'd like to do a big MGM-like musical. We'd synthesize forms and end up with an MGM musical but with the music of today."

With a script in place, the cast was assembled. In the spring of 1977, Frampton, The Bee Gees, and Martin met to begin work on the soundtrack. Filming started in October 1977 on the backlot of MGM Studios in Culver City, where the set of Heartland, USA was built. Interiors were filmed at Universal City Studios.

Soundtrack album

Reception

Although Universal had high hopes for the movie – anticipating "this generation's Gone with the Wind " – it worked out differently. According to film historian Leonard Maltin's TV, Movie & Video Guide, the picture "just doesn't work" and "ranges from tolerable to embarrassing. As for the Bee Gees' acting, well, if you can't say something nice..." On Rotten Tomatoes, the film has a 11% score based on 27 reviews with an average rating of 3.9/10. The site's critical consensus reads "I thought you might like to know that the Beatles (aka the act you've known for all these years) are ill-served by this kitschy, aggressively whimsical fantasy film that's most certainly not a thrill".

In Rolling Stone, Paul Nelson ridiculed virtually every aspect of the production. He said that Frampton had "absolutely no future in Hollywood" while Schultz "would seem to need direction merely to find the set, let alone the camera". Nelson commented on the musical soundtrack: "The album proves conclusively that you can't go home again in 1978. Or, if you do, you'd better be aware of who's taken over the neighborhood." The New York Timess Janet Maslin wrote that the "musical numbers are strung together so mindlessly that the movie has the feel of an interminable variety show", also adding that "conceived in a spirit of merriment...watching it feels like playing shuffleboard at the absolute insistence of a bossy shipboard social director. When whimsy gets to be this overbearing, it simply isn't whimsy any more." Similarly, David Ansen of Newsweek dismissed Sgt. Pepper as "a film with a dangerous resemblance to wallpaper".

A more positive review came from The Valley Independent, whose Ron Paglia called the film "Good, campy fun", citing Steve Martin's performance as "a high point" and the celebrity-filled finale as "something special" before concluding "there's much to enjoy." The Intelligencers Lou Gaul described the production as "A sort of modern Fantasia for today's teens".

The film was ranked  No. 76 on VH1's 100 Most Shocking Moments in Rock and Roll.

Band response
When asked about the film in a 1979 interview, George Harrison expressed his sympathy for Stigwood, Frampton and the Bee Gees, acknowledging that they had all worked hard to achieve success before making Sgt. Pepper. He said of Frampton and the Bee Gees: "I think it's damaged their images, their careers, and they didn't need to do that. It's just like the Beatles trying to do the Rolling Stones. The Rolling Stones can do it better."

Nominations
At the 1978 Stinkers Bad Movie Awards, the film received a nomination for Worst Picture. When the ballot was revised in 2003, it kept that nomination while also receiving nominations for Worst Supporting Actress (Dianne Steinberg, who played Lucy in the film) and Worst On-Screen Group (Lucy and the Diamonds).

Box office
The film was a minor commercial success, earning $20.4 million against the production budget of $13 million.

See also
 All This and World War II, a 1976 musical documentary that also used the concept of using covers of Beatles songs to tell a story.
 Across the Universe, a 2007 musical film that also used the concept of using Beatles songs to tell a story.
 List of cover versions of Beatles songs

Other films released during the late 1970s disco and jukebox movie musical craze
 Saturday Night Fever (1977)
 Thank God It's Friday (1978)
 Skatetown, U.S.A. (1979)
 Roller Boogie (1979)
 The Apple (1980)
 Xanadu (1980)
 Can't Stop the Music (1980)
 Fame (1980)

References

External links
 
 
 
 
 

1978 films
1970s English-language films
1970s musical comedy films
American musical comedy films
American rock musicals
The Beatles in film
Bee Gees
Films based on albums
Films directed by Michael Schultz
Films produced by Robert Stigwood
Films shot in Los Angeles County, California
Jukebox musical films
Sung-through musical films
Universal Pictures films
1978 comedy films
1970s American films

hu:Sgt Pepper's Lonely Hearts Club Band (filmzene)